Garrigan may refer to:

 Alison Garrigan (born 1958), American singer
 Jacques Garrigan (1725–?), French bookseller
 Jim Garrigan (1905–1971), Australian politician
 Liam Garrigan (born 1981), English actor
 Mike Garrigan, lead singer of the American band Collapsis
 Philip Joseph Garrigan (1840–1919), American Roman Catholic bishop
 Steve Garrigan, lead singer of the Irish band Kodaline
 Anthony Garrigan, (born 1965), Software Developer

Fictional characters
 Nicholas Garrigan, character in The Last King of Scotland